Retreat, Hell! is a 1952 American war film about the 1st Marine Division in the Korean War, directed by Joseph H. Lewis. It stars Frank Lovejoy as a career Marine battalion commander who is recalled from work at an American embassy, Richard Carlson as a veteran captain and communications specialist of World War II called up from the Marine Corps Reserves, Russ Tamblyn as a seventeen-year-old private who hides his true age to serve with the unit overseas and outdo his older brother, also a Marine, and Nedrick Young (credited as Ned Young). Also appearing in the film is Peter Julien Ortiz, a highly decorated Marine who served in the Office of Strategic Services (OSS) and appeared in various films after retiring from the military.

Plot
The saga of a battalion of U.S. Marines during the Korean War, starting with their training, landing at Inchon in 1950, advance into North Korea and their subsequent retreat back to the 38th parallel.

Cast
 Frank Lovejoy as Lt. Col. Steve L. Corbett 
 Richard Carlson as Capt. Paul Hansen
 Anita Louise as Ruth Hansen
 Russ Tamblyn as PFC later Corporal Jimmy W. McDermid (as Rusty Tamblyn)
 Nedrick Young as Sgt. Novak (as Ned Young)
 Lamont Johnson as Capt. ‘Tink’ O’Grady
 Robert Ellis as Shorty Devine
 Paul Smith as Andy Smith
 Peter Ortiz as Maj. Knox
 Dorothy Patrick as Eve O’Grady

Production
With the U.S. Marine Corps's fight for life at the Battle of Chosin Reservoir against the Chinese Communist Forces offensive in the winter of 1950 being anxiously followed in the news of the day, Warner Brothers submitted a proposal on 7 December 1950 to the Marines to make a film about the events.  The Marines approved the request, with former Marine Milton Sperling producing and co-writing the film for his United States Pictures division of Warners. The Marine Corps worked closely with Sperling on the script giving it their approval in August 1951 and agreeing to six weeks of filming at Camp Pendleton where the film crew bulldozed a road and sprinkled the area with gypsum to simulate snow. The Marines also created accurate Korean villages for the film. Commandant of the Marine Corps Lemuel Shepherd estimated the value of the Marine cooperation at US$1,000,000.  The Hollywood Production Code Office originally refused to approve the title because of its ban on the word "hell", but changed their mind after requests from the Marine Corps.  The film was also intended to showcase the diverse background of the Americans.  Richard Carlson was a Norwegian-American from Minnesota, and so his character was given the last name "Hansen" (the most common surname in Norway), and Nedrick Young's character is given the name "Sergeant Novak", with Novak being a name of Slovak origins and Frank Lovejoy having the Anglo name Corbett.  While the film uses fictional characters, it faithfully follows the true story of the First Marine Battalion's battles at Inchon and Seoul and is therefore ranked as one of the most realistic movies ever made about the Korean War.

The film also features the efforts of the U.S. Navy and Royal Marines.

Director Joseph H. Lewis had been hired by Warner Brothers after the success of his film Gun Crazy but had not been given any assignment until this film. During World War II, Lewis directed US Army training films about the M1 Garand rifle that were shown well into the 1960s.

Reception
Variety called it a "top-notch war drama" for the way it balanced tense action with a more human face of the war, anticipating film-making trends that would become more common twenty years later.  The film did fairly well at the box office, but was proportionately boosted due to the fact that the film was heavily promoted in some locales where a number of drive-in theaters showed it as their only option for several consecutive months.  This was the case at a series of locally owned drive-in theaters in Indiana, Illinois, Michigan, Ohio and Wisconsin.  As a result, in the Wisconsin counties of Polk, Barron, Price, Clark, Marinette, Oconto, Shawano, Waupaca, Dodge, and Taylor, it was the only movie one could see in a drive-in for multiple consecutive months.  This was also the case in the Indiana counties of Kosciusko, Whitley, Huntington, Adams, Morgan, Jackson, and Greene and the Illinois counties of Ogle and Bureau.  Following Retreat, Hell!, the same theaters showed One Minute to Zero as their only option for several more months.  They would only do this once more for the movie Tarzan and the Lost Safari released in 1957.

In an oral history interview with Donald H. Eaton, a Korean War black veteran, he recounts how he and several friends watched the film when it came out. After, he and half of his friends enlisted in the Marine Corps. The Korean War (1950–1953) was the first war where United States troops were desegregated.

References

Suid, Lawrence H. Guts and Glory: The Making of the American Military Image in Film, University Press of Kentucky, 2002.
Variety editors. Variety Movie Guide, Perigee Books edition, 2000.

External links
 
 
 

1952 films
Warner Bros. films
American war films
American black-and-white films
1950s English-language films
Films directed by Joseph H. Lewis
Korean War films
Films set in North Korea

United States in the Korean War
Films about the United States Marine Corps
1950s war films
1950s American films